The Kwara Falcons are a Nigerian basketball team based in Ilorin, Kwara. The team plays in the Nigerian Premier League and has won one championship in 2022. Currently, the Falcons also compete in the Basketball Africa League (BAL). 

The team plays in the indoor sports complex in the Kwara Stadium.

History 
The Kwara Falcons were promoted to the Premier League in 2013, after winning the Atlantic Conference in the Division 1. In their first season in the top-flight, the Falcons managed to avoid relegation. In 2015, the team finished third in the Atlantic Conference, behind star players such as Baba Jubril, Lanre Alimi and Tunde El-Alawa. In 2016 and 2017, the Falcons reached the semi-finals of the national championship.

In 2018, Kwara were the runners-up of the Premier League, finishing only behind Rivers Hoopers.

On November 12, 2022, the Falcons won their first-ever national championship after winning the 2022 season. As a result, they qualified directly for the 2023 season of the Basketball Africa League (BAL).

The Falcons strengthened their roster with AJ Wilson, Michael Kolawole and Jeremiah Mordi.

Honours
Nigerian Premier League
Champions (1): 2022
Runner-up (1): 2018
Third place (1): 2019
Louis Edem Invitational Tournament

 Winners (1): 2023

Players

Current roster
As of 30 January 2023.

Head coach: Baba Jubril

References

External links
Twitter profile
Facebook page

Basketball teams in Nigeria
Sport in Kwara State
Basketball Africa League teams